Joan, Princess of Wales may refer to:
Joan, Lady of Wales, illegitimate daughter of King John
Joan, Countess of Kent, wife of Edward the Black Prince